Conspiracy is a 2008 American action thriller film written and directed by Adam Marcus and stars Val Kilmer and Jennifer Esposito. The film is influenced by the classic western film noir thriller Bad Day at Black Rock (1955), which itself was an adaptation of a short story "Bad Time at Honda" by Howard Breslin. The film was released on direct-to-DVD in the United States on March 18, 2008.
 
Whilst Bad Day at Black Rock tells the story of wounded World War II vet John J. MacReedy, Conspiracy revolves around William "Spooky" MacPherson, a disabled special operations marine wounded during combat operations in Iraq. When MacPherson decides to visit a friend on a ranch in the southwest, he discovers that his friend has disappeared, and no one will acknowledge that he ever lived there.

The film was shot in Galisteo, New Mexico in 30 days from April 19 to May 19, 2007.

Cast
 Val Kilmer as MacPherson
 Gary Cole as Rhodes
 Jennifer Esposito as Joanna
 Jay Jablonski as Deputy Foster
 Greg Serano as Miguel Silva
 Stacy Marie Warden as Carly
 Christopher Gehrman as E. B.
 Bob Rumnock as Sheriff Bock
 Jude B. Lanston as Sergeant

Reception
The movie received overwhelmingly negative reviews. Richard Roeper wrote, "It's beyond dreadful. It's jaw-droppingly bad."

References

External links
Official website

2008 films
2008 direct-to-video films
2008 action thriller films
American action thriller films
Direct-to-video action films
Films directed by Adam Marcus
Films shot in New Mexico
Iraq War films
Sony Pictures direct-to-video films
Stage 6 Films films
2000s English-language films
2000s American films